Ranpur may refer to the following places in India:

 Ranpur, Gujarat, a town in Gujarat
 Ranpur Taluka, a taluka in Botad district of Gujarat
 Ranpur, Abdasa, a village in Abdasa Taluka, Kutch District, Gujarat
 Raj-Ranpur, Odisha, also known as "Ranpur", a town in Odisha
 Ranpur (Odisha Vidhan Sabha constituency)
 Ranpur State, a former princely state of Odisha
 Porbandar State, also known as Ranpur, a former princely state of Gujarat

See also 
 Ranapur, a town in Madhya Pradesh
 Ranipur (disambiguation)
 Rangpur (disambiguation)
 Rampur (disambiguation)